106 (one hundred [and] six) is the natural number following 105 and preceding 107.

In mathematics
106 is a centered pentagonal number, a centered heptagonal number, and a regular 19-gonal number. 
There are 106 mathematical trees with ten vertices.

See also
 106 (disambiguation)

References 

Integers